The 1984–85 Thorn EMI Rugby Union County Championship was the 85th edition of England's County Championship rugby union club competition.

Middlesex won their 8th title after defeating Notts, Lincs & Derby in the final.

First Round

Semi finals

Final

See also
 English rugby union system
 Rugby union in England

References

Rugby Union County Championship
County Championship (rugby union) seasons